Charles Gerard Conn Mansion, also known as the Strong-Conn Mansion, is a historic home located at Elkhart, Elkhart County, Indiana.  It was built in 1884, and is a two-story, Italianate style painted brick mansion.  It features a two-story, Classical Revival style wraparound porch supported by 17 pillars and two-story projecting front bay. It was the home of musical instrument manufacturer C.G. Conn (1884-1931).

It was added to the National Register of Historic Places in 2007.

References

Houses on the National Register of Historic Places in Indiana
Italianate architecture in Indiana
Neoclassical architecture in Indiana
Houses completed in 1884
Houses in Elkhart County, Indiana
National Register of Historic Places in Elkhart County, Indiana
Buildings and structures in Elkhart, Indiana